Benli is a surname. Notable people with the surname include:

 Nilay Benli (born 1985), Turkish volleyball player
 Wang Benli (died 690), Chinese chancellor

Turkish-language surnames